Sanctuary is an American thrash/power metal band, formed in 1985 in Seattle, Washington. They were broken up from 1992 to 2010. The band consists of Lenny Rutledge (guitar), Joseph Michael (vocals), George Hernandez (bass), and Dave Budbill (drums). The lead vocalist position was held by Warrel Dane until his death in 2017. They have released four studio albums and one live EP.

Despite never reaching mainstream success, Sanctuary is often credited for popularizing the 1980s and early 1990s Seattle hard rock and heavy metal scene, which spawned bands such as Mother Love Bone, Alice in Chains, Soundgarden, Queensrÿche, Metal Church, Fifth Angel, TKO, Culprit, Rail, Forced Entry and Q5.

History

Initial career (1985–1992) 
Sanctuary released a well-received demo in 1986, which led them to sign with Epic Records in the following year. They released their debut album, Refuge Denied, in 1988, which was produced by Megadeth frontman Dave Mustaine, and subsequently toured worldwide in support of the album, playing with bands such as Megadeth, Warlock, Savatage, Testament, Nuclear Assault, Flotsam and Jetsam, Vio-lence, Fates Warning, Meliah Rage and Forced Entry.

In 1989, after the Refuge Denied tour ended, Sanctuary entered the studio to record their second studio album, Into the Mirror Black, which was released in 1990. A video clip for the song "Future Tense" was made and received some airplay on MTV's Headbangers Ball. While touring in support of the album (with bands such as Fates Warning, Morbid Angel, Forbidden, Death Angel, Forced Entry and Blitzspeer), guitarist Sean Blosl left the band and was replaced by Jeff Loomis.

Shortly after, pressure from Epic Records to fit in with the flourishing Seattle grunge scene caused disagreements between band members regarding the band's musical direction. In 1992, Sanctuary officially disbanded.

Epic Records was to release a full-length live recording from this final tour, but only a limited number of copies of a promotional live EP ever saw the light of day. It was named Into the Mirror Live.

Refuge Denied and Into the Mirror Black were re-released as a double CD set by IronBird Records on February 22, 2010.

Post-breakup (1992–2010) 
After disbanding, Warrel Dane, Jim Sheppard and Jeff Loomis formed the band Nevermore in 1992. Lenny Rutledge became a musical producer, and has his own studio. Additionally, he helped Nevermore on the demo sessions of their 1998 album, Dreaming Neon Black. Nevermore eventually went on hiatus in April 2011 after 19 years and 7 studio albums.

Reunion and The Year the Sun Died (2010–2015) 

In 2010, four of the founding Sanctuary members — Warrel Dane, Jim Sheppard, Lenny Rutledge and Dave Budbill — came together for a few select reunion performances. At first, it was just going to be a handful of shows, but the response and chemistry on stage was so overwhelming that they decided to reunite permanently. The band's first shows after included Jeff Loomis as a second guitarist, though he departed simultaneously to his departure from Nevermore. Former Forced Entry guitarist Brad Hull, who had earlier touring experience with the band, became a permanent member shortly after.

A US appearance in 2011 took take place at ProgPower USA in Atlanta on Friday, September 16, 2011. The band also played on the 70000 Tons of Metal festival on board Royal Caribbeans' Majesty of the Seas in January 2011 on the same date as Nevermore. In January 2013 Sanctuary got a deal with Century Media.

Regarding how the reunion came about, Dane told Rock My Monkey TV, "[Sanctuary guitarist Lenny Rutledge and I] always talked to each other, but never really been friends again. And when the whole thing came about, that we were actually friends again, that's when we started talking more about doing it. And it definitely wasn't because Nevermore was imploding ... which it was, at that point ... We all just started talking with each other again. That was kind of the groundwork for it. And then we started saying, 'Well, gosh, let's make music again.' And my god! Lenny is writing some stuff that is so friggin great! Obviously, he's been bottling this up for years, because he really hasn't been doing anything ... Well, he's had bands here and there. But he's really writing some great stuff that's really inspiring me, and making me fall in love with music again, with the creative process ... everything that revolves around that. Really inspiring me to write really evil lyrics."

On the topic of the sound of the comeback album, Dane said, "This record is not going to sound like the other two. It might sound very similar to the second one ('Into The Mirror Black'). It's definitely not going to sound like the first one, because we're all a little bit older and I can't come up with a c-clamp for a scrotum and a helium tank ... It's not going to sound like the old ones ... it's 2011. It's still gonna be that good, I think, and there's gonna be high-pitched screaming. I'm making sure of that. With Nevermore, high-pitched screaming was never really called for. You know, with Sanctuary ... of course it is."

The band's third studio album, The Year the Sun Died, was finished in June 2014 and released on October 14 in North America and October 6 in Europe via Century Media. It was produced by Zeuss. The track listing was revealed in August 2014, artwork and the song "Arise and Purify" made available. A lyric video for "Exitium (Anthem of the Living)" was released shortly thereafter, with the video for single "Frozen" debuting on October 7. Ultimately, three songs on the album did feature Dane's trademark high-pitched vocals, though the majority of the singing was more in line with the baritone and bass vocals that were featured prominently in Nevermore.

In February 2015, Brad Hull's departure was announced, with guitarist Nick Cordle, formerly of Arsis and Arch Enemy, filling in for March and April tour dates. His future status with the band is currently unclear. Warrel Dane said the split with Brad Hull was due to "personal things that happened", that are better not to discuss in public, but said they are still friends. Zeuss [a.k.a. Chris Harris], their producer for "The Year the Sun Died", recruited Nick Cordle for the band when they found out Brad Hull would not be doing the European tour, since canceling the tour was not an option.

Dead Again and Inception (2015–2017) 

Asked in October 2015 if Sanctuary had been writing new material for a fourth album, frontman Warrel Dane replied, 

Pictures posted on the band's Facebook page on April 22, 2016 included a reference to ex-Panic bassist George Hernandez, who had filled in for Sheppard on tour the previous year, as the band's new permanent bassist.

In another interview by September 2016 Dane revealed Dead Again as a tentative title for the new album. He said that it would come "next year, but late next year". Dane described the material as "way faster and more like old-school thrash metal, but sounding a bit modern and it's f ... cking heavy." He also announced the compilation of old demos and songs named Inception, that could arrive "in a few months".

Death of Warrel Dane and the future of the band (2017–present) 
On December 13, 2017, it was reported that Dane had died of a heart attack in São Paulo, Brazil, where he was recording his second solo album.

The band toured North America with Iced Earth in February and March 2018 for the tribute to Dane tour with Witherfall vocalist Joseph Michael filling in on vocals. Current Armageddon guitarist Joey Concepcion of Milford, Connecticut has joined the tour on guitar. The tour was well-received, prompting Rutledge and Michael to begin working on demos to potentially continue the band.

Members 
Current members
 Lenny Rutledge – guitars (1985–1992, 2010–present)
 Dave Budbill – drums (1985–1992, 2010–present)
 George Hernandez – bass (2016–present; touring member: 2014–2016)
 Joseph Michael – vocals (2018–present)

Former members
 Warrel Dane – vocals (1985–1992, 2010–2017) (died 2017)
 Jim Sheppard – bass (1985–1992, 2010–2016)
 Sean Blosl – guitars (1985–1990)
 Jeff Loomis – guitars (1990–1992, 2010–2011)
 Brad Hull – guitars (2011–2015)
 Nick Cordle – guitars (2015–2016)
 Joey Concepcion – guitar (2018–2020)

Touring
 Attila Vörös – guitars (2017, 2020)

Discography

Studio albums

Live albums

Compilation

Timeline

References 

Musical groups established in 1985
Musical groups disestablished in 1992
Musical groups reestablished in 2010
Heavy metal musical groups from Washington (state)
American power metal musical groups
Musical groups from Seattle
1985 establishments in Washington (state)